Phoebe formosana is a species of tree in the family Lauraceae. It is endemic to China and Taiwan.

References

Endemic flora of China
Trees of China
formosana
Plants described in 1906